Anne or Anne Mackenzie may refer to:

 Anne MacKenzie (journalist) (born 1960), British television journalist
 Anne MacKenzie (judge), Canadian judge in the province of British Columbia
 Anne Mackenzie (writer) (died 1877), British writer
 Anne Mackenzie (politician), American politician
 Anne Mackenzie-Stuart (1930–2008), Scottish political activist

See also
 Anna Mackenzie (1621–1707), wife of Alexander Lindsay, 1st Earl of Balcarres and Archibald Campbell, 9th Earl of Argyll
 Anna Mackenzie (writer) (born 1963), New Zealand writer
 Anna Maria Mackenzie (fl. 1783–1811), British novelist